Kramarenko (Cyrillic: Крамаре́нко) is a unisex Ukrainian surname that may refer to the following notable people:

 Anton Kramarenko (born 1984), Kyrgyzstani swimmer
 Boris Kramarenko (born 1955), Soviet wrestler
 Dmitriy Kramarenko (born 1974), Azerbaijani football goalkeeper
 Ekaterina Kramarenko (born 1991), Russian artistic gymnast
 Lala Kramarenko (born 2004), Russian rhythmic gymnast 
 Oleh Kramarenko (disambiguation), multiple people 
 Sergey Kramarenko (disambiguation), multiple people 
Yana Kramarenko (born 2002), Israeli rhythmic gymnast

See also
 

Ukrainian-language surnames